is a former Grand Prix motorcycle road racer from Japan. Tsujimura began his Grand Prix career in 1993 with Yamaha. He enjoyed his best season in 1994 when he won four races and finished the season in third place behind Kazuto Sakata and Noboru Ueda in the 125cc world championship. In 2006, he teamed with Shinichi Itoh to win the Suzuka 8 Hours endurance race.

References 

Japanese motorcycle racers
125cc World Championship riders
250cc World Championship riders
Superbike World Championship riders
1974 births
Living people
Sportspeople from Osaka